This is a list of the U.S. Billboard magazine Hot 100 number-ones of 1993. There were 11 singles that topped the chart this year. The first of these, "I Will Always Love You" by Whitney Houston, spent nine weeks at the top, concluding a 14-week run that had begun in November 1992.

That year, 6 acts earn their first number one song: Peabo Bryson, Regina Belle, Snow, Silk, SWV, and Meat Loaf. Janet Jackson and Mariah Carey were the only acts to hit number one more than once, with each of them hitting twice.

Chart history

Number-one artists

See also
1993 in music
List of Billboard number-one singles

References

Additional sources
Fred Bronson's Billboard Book of Number 1 Hits, 5th Edition
Joel Whitburn's Top Pop Singles 1955-2008, 12 Edition
Joel Whitburn Presents the Billboard Hot 100 Charts: The Nineties
Additional information obtained can be verified within Billboard's online archive services and print editions of the magazine.

United States Hot 100
1993